Dagoberto Planos Despaigne (June 1956 – 3 March 2021) was a Cuban singer. He was one of the leading vocalists of the Karachi orchestra. He died from cirrhosis.

References

External links
 

1956 births
2021 deaths
20th-century Cuban male singers
21st-century Cuban male singers
Deaths from cirrhosis